Golovinsky District  is an administrative district (raion) of Northern Administrative Okrug, and one of the 125 raions of Moscow, Russia. According to a 2018 estimate, the population of the district is 103,148.

See also

Administrative divisions of Moscow

References

Notes

Sources

Districts of Moscow
Northern Administrative Okrug